Tree63 is Tree63's third album, released in October 24, 2000. It features songs from the first two studio albums Overflow and 63. Joy and Worldwide were originally released on Overflow, the remaining tracks were originally released on 63.

Track listing
 "Treasure"
 "Joy"
 "Look What You've Done"
 "Sacrifice"
 "Earnestly"
 "Anthem"
 "A Million Lights"
 "1*0*1*"
 "Can I See Your Face?"
 "Worldwide"

See also 
Tree63

Christian rock

References 

2000 albums
Tree63 albums
Inpop Records albums